Ann Harrison may refer to:

 Ann, Lady Fanshawe (1625–1680), née Harrison, English memoirist
 Ann Harrison (1974–1989), American murder victim
 Ann Harrison (lung transplant recipient) (1944–2001), lung transplant receiver
 Ann E. Harrison, American economist

See also
Annie Harrison (disambiguation)